Elmer MacIntosh MacKay  (born August 5, 1936) is a former Canadian politician.

Life and career
MacKay was born in Hopewell, Nova Scotia, the son of Laura Louise (Macintosh) and Gordon Barclay MacKay. He was first elected to the House of Commons of Canada as the Progressive Conservative (PC) Member of Parliament (MP) for Central Nova through a 1971 by-election. He was re-elected in subsequent elections, and served as Minister of Regional Economic Expansion in the short lived (1979–1980) government of Prime Minister Joe Clark.

MacKay resigned his parliamentary seat in 1983 in order to allow newly elected PC leader Brian Mulroney to enter Parliament through a by-election in MacKay's Nova Scotia riding. In the subsequent 1984 election, Mulroney moved to a Quebec riding, and MacKay was again returned to the House as Central Nova's MP.

Following the election, Mulroney became prime minister, and appointed MacKay to the Cabinet of Canada where he served as Solicitor General of Canada for a year before becoming Minister of National Revenue. In 1989, MacKay became Minister of Public Works.  From 1989 to 1991, he was also responsible for the Atlantic Canada Opportunities Agency Act. The opposition Liberals and New Democratic Party often accused MacKay of doling out patronage appointments. While no wrongdoing was ever proven, MacKay was removed from the ACOA portfolio in 1991. From 1991 to 1993, he remained Public Works minister and was given responsibility for the Canada Mortgage and Housing Corporation.

MacKay retired from Cabinet when Mulroney's tenure as party leader ended in 1993, and did not run in the 1993 election.

Elmer MacKay's son, Peter, was the Conservative member for Central Nova, a re-creation of the same riding his father once represented. Like Elmer, Peter served as minister responsible for ACOA, and for Prince Edward Island. Peter also served as the final leader of the Progressive Conservative Party of Canada before it merged with the Canadian Alliance into the present-day Conservative Party.

Controversy
MacKay is a longtime associate of former Prime Minister Brian Mulroney and German businessman Karlheinz Schreiber, who were negotiating the purchase of Airbus aircraft for Air Canada in 1988. As a result of subsequent Royal Canadian Mounted Police charges against Mulroney for accepting kickbacks on this transaction, a federal inquiry was launched, which found that Mulroney had accepted at least $300,000 in cash from Schreiber after the transaction. Mulroney's defence stated these payments were in return for consulting services. Documents show that MacKay drafted a letter that was eventually released by Schreiber as evidence that Scheiber's and Mulroney's business dealings were legitimate. It is not known why MacKay drafted a letter that was later offered as evidence and supposedly written by Schreiber.

Evidence tabled at the Airbus inquiry included entries in Schreiber’s diary that indicated Schreiber had made phone calls to MacKay on the same dates during which the first two Airbus meetings were held between Mulroney and Schreiber. MacKay has confirmed he had lunch with Mulroney and Schreiber the day of the third meeting. In addition, Schreiber’s diary shows he made phone calls to MacKay on two days in July 1993 when he made banking transactions in Switzerland to obtain money to pay Mulroney.

Although MacKay was closely involved with Mulroney and Schreiber during the time of the Airbus purchases, he has never been formally charged for wrongdoing in the scandal.

Electoral history

References

External links
 

1936 births
Canadian King's Counsel
Lawyers in Nova Scotia
Living people
Members of the 21st Canadian Ministry
Members of the 24th Canadian Ministry
Members of the House of Commons of Canada from Nova Scotia
Members of the King's Privy Council for Canada
People from Pictou County
Progressive Conservative Party of Canada MPs
Solicitors General of Canada